Smash & Grab: The Story of the Pink Panthers is a 2013 documentary by Havana Marking based upon the international jewel thief network called the Pink Panthers. The film had a limited release on 31 July 2013 and had a wider release in the United Kingdom on September 27, 2013. It was pitched at the 2010 Sheffield Doc/Fest MeetMarket prior to completion.

Synopsis
The film features Closed-circuit television footage from several of the jewel heists attributed to the Pink Panthers, who are credited with over 300 jewel thefts throughout the world. Interspersed throughout the documentary are interviews with various personas such as crime experts as well as anonymous interviews with persons claiming to be members of the Pink Panthers. Smash & Grab also features several segments that follow Mike (Tomislav Tom Benzon), Mr. Green (Daniel Vivian), and Lena (Jasmin Topalusic), fictionalized depictions of members of the Pink Panthers.

Reception
Critical reception has been largely positive. As of October 2, 2013, review aggregator Rotten Tomatoes has the film listed as 83% "fresh" based upon 15 reviews. The Guardian gave the film four stars, commenting that it "asks some fascinating questions – and has fascinating footage to match".

References

External links
 
 
 

2013 documentary films
2013 films
Documentary films about crime
British documentary films
Films about the Serbian Mafia
American documentary films
Serbian documentary films
Montenegrin documentary films
2010s English-language films
2010s American films
2010s British films